Supphellebreen is a glacier in the Fjærland area of Sogndal Municipality in Vestland county, Norway.

It is located inside Jostedalsbreen National Park. It is a side branch of the main Jostedalsbreen glacier. The glacier is split into an upper and a lower part, with a non-glaciated area between. The Bøyabreen glacier lies just northwest of Supphellebreen.

See also
List of glaciers in Norway

References

Glaciers of Vestland
Sogndal
Tourist attractions in Vestland